Fiori is an Italian surname. Notable people with the surname include:

Federico Fiori, Italian Renaissance painter and printmaker

Adriano Fiori (1865–1950), Italian botanist
Al Fiori, American former Los Angeles radio personality and pioneer rock and roll DJ
Attilio Fiori (1883–1958), Italian entomologist
Carlos Eduardo de Fiori Mendes (born 1986), better known as Cadù, Brazilian footballer
Diego Fulvio Fiori (born 1975), Italian artist, director and film producer
Ed Fiori (born 1953), American golfer
Ezio Fiori (born 1949), Italian bobsledder
Fabrizio Della Fiori (born 1951), Italian basketball player
Henri Fiori (1881–1963), French politician
Jennifer Fiori (1986–2021), Italian cyclist
Juliano Fiori (born 1985), Brazilian rugby sevens player
Mario P. Fiori, United States Assistant Secretary of the Army
Patrick Fiori (born 1969), French singer
Publio Fiori (born 1938), Italian politician
Serge Fiori (born 1952), Canadian musician
Valerio Fiori (born 1969), Italian footballer

Italian-language surnames